Kluge's dwarf gecko (Lygodactylus klugei) is a species of gecko, a lizard in the family Gekkonidae. The species is native to northeastern Brazil.

Etymology
The specific name, klugei, is in honor of American herpetologist Arnold G. Kluge.

Geographic range
L. klugei is found in the Brazilian States of Bahia, Ceará, Piauí, and Rio Grande do Norte.

Habitat
The preferred natural habitat of L. klugei is savanna.

Diet
L. klugei mainly preys upon insects and spiders, but it also eats nectar.

Reproduction
L. klugei is oviparous.

References

Further reading
Bons, Jacques; Pasteur, Georges (1977). "Solution histologique à un problème de taxinomie herpétologique interessant les rapports paléobiologiques de l'Amerique du Sud e de l'Afrique ". C. R. Acad. Sci. Paris 284 (D): 2547–2550. (Lygodactylus klugei, new combination). (in French).
Lanna FM, Gehara M, Werneck FP, Fonseca EM, Colli GR, Sites JW, Rodrigues MT, Garda AA (2019). "Dwarf geckos and giant rivers: the role of the São Francisco River in the evolution of Lygodactylus klugei (Squamata: Gekkonidae) in the semi-arid Caatinga of north-eastern Brazil". Biological Journal of the Linnean Society 129 (1): 88–98.
Rösler H (2000). "Kommentierte Liste der rezent, subrezent und fossil bekannten Geckotaxa (Reptilia: Gekkonomorpha)". Gekkota 2: 28–153. (Vanzoi klugei, p. 120). (in German).
Smith, Hobart M.; Martin, Robert L.; Swain, Tom A. (1977). "A new genus and two new species of South American geckos (Reptilia: Lacertilia)". Papéis Avulsos de Zoologia, Museu de Zoologia da Universidade de São Paulo 30: 195–213. (Vanzoia klugei, new species, p. 196).

Lygodactylus
Endemic fauna of Brazil
Reptiles of Brazil
Reptiles described in 1977
Taxa named by Hobart Muir Smith